The 2007–08 Premier League (known as the Barclays Premier League for sponsorship reasons) season was the 16th since its establishment. The first matches of the season were played on 11 August 2007, and the season ended on 11 May 2008. Manchester United went into the 2007–08 season as the Premier League's defending champions, having won their ninth Premier League title and sixteenth league championship overall the previous season. This season was also the third consecutive season to see the "Big Four" continue their stranglehold on the top four spots (which mean UEFA Champions League qualification).

The first goal of the season was scored by Michael Chopra, who scored a 94th-minute winner for Sunderland against Tottenham in the early kick-off. The first red card of the season was given to Reading's Dave Kitson after a challenge on Patrice Evra in their opening game against Manchester United. The first hat-trick was scored by Emmanuel Adebayor in the match between Arsenal and Derby County.

On 29 September 2007, Portsmouth beat Reading 7–4 in the highest-scoring match in Premier League history. On 15 December 2007, both Roque Santa Cruz (Blackburn Rovers) and Marcus Bent (Wigan Athletic) scored hat-tricks during Wigan's 5–3 home win over Blackburn. This was the first occasion in Premier League history that two players on opposing teams had scored hat-tricks during the same match.

On 29 March 2008, Derby County drew 2–2 with Fulham while Birmingham City, who were 17th in the table at the time, beat Manchester City 3–1, to make Derby County the first team in Premier League history to be relegated in March, ending the season with an all-time top flight record low points tally of just 11.

On 11 May 2008, the final day of the season, Manchester United beat Wigan Athletic 2–0 while Chelsea drew 1–1 with Bolton Wanderers, thus crowning Manchester United with their tenth Premier League title, and 17th championship overall, just one behind Liverpool's total of 18. Meanwhile, despite Birmingham beating Blackburn Rovers 4–1 and Reading beating Derby 4–0, both Birmingham and Reading were relegated due to Fulham's 1–0 win over Portsmouth. This meant that Fulham avoided relegation by a goal difference of −22, compared to Reading's −25. On the same day, Middlesbrough beat Manchester City 8–1 to claim the biggest win of the season.

The season was notable for the return of the English league to the top of UEFA's official ranking list, overtaking La Liga for the period from 1 May 2008 to 30 April 2009. This followed the success of English clubs in the UEFA Champions League, with both champions Manchester United and runners-up Chelsea reaching the European Cup final. This was the first time that the English league had topped the UEFA rankings since the Heysel Stadium disaster in 1985.

Teams
Twenty teams competed in the league – the top seventeen teams from the previous season and the three teams promoted from the Championship. The promoted teams were Sunderland, Birmingham City (both teams returning after a season's absence) and Derby County (returning after a five-year absence). They replaced Sheffield United, Charlton Athletic and Watford. The previous season had seen Sheffield United and Watford both suffer an immediate return to the Championship, while Charlton Athletic were relegated after a seven-year top flight spell.

Stadiums and locations

Personnel and kits

In addition, Premier League officials were supplied with new kit made by Umbro, replacing American makers Official Sports, and are sponsored by Air Asia, replacing Emirates. The 2007–08 season saw a new font used for the names on the back of players' shirts.

Managerial changes

League table

Results

Season statistics

Scoring
First goal of the season: Michael Chopra for Sunderland against Tottenham Hotspur (11 August 2007)
Last goal of the season: Matthew Taylor for Bolton Wanderers against Chelsea (11 May 2008)
Fastest goal in a match: 28 seconds – Geovanni for Manchester City against Wigan Athletic (1 December 2007)
Goal scored at the latest point in a match: 90+6 minutes – Andy Reid for Sunderland against West Ham United (29 March 2008)
Widest winning margin: 7 goals – Middlesbrough 8–1 Manchester City (11 May 2008)
Most goals in a match: 11 – Portsmouth F.C. 7–4 Reading F.C. (29 September 2007)
First hat-trick of the season: Emmanuel Adebayor for Arsenal against Derby County (22 September 2007)
First own goal of the season: Martin Laursen for Liverpool against Aston Villa (11 August 2007)
Most goals by one player in a single match: 4
Dimitar Berbatov for Tottenham Hotspur against Reading (29 December 2007)
Frank Lampard for Chelsea against Derby County (12 March 2008)
Most hat-tricks scored by one player: 2
Benjani for Portsmouth
Portsmouth 7–4 Reading (29 September 2007)
Portsmouth 3–1 Derby County (19 January 2008)
Fernando Torres for Liverpool
Liverpool 3–2 Middlesbrough (23 February 2008)
Liverpool 4–0 West Ham United (5 March 2008)
Emmanuel Adebayor for Arsenal
Arsenal 5–0 Derby County (22 September 2007)
Derby County 2–6 Arsenal (28 April 2008)
This is the first time in the Premier League that any player has scored a hat-trick against the same team twice in one season.
Most goals by one team in a match: 8
Middlesbrough 8–1 Manchester City (11 May 2008)
Most goals in one half by one team: 6
Manchester United 6–0 Newcastle United (12 January 2008)
Middlesbrough 8–1 Manchester City (11 May 2008)
Most goals scored by losing team: 4 – Reading
Portsmouth 7–4 Reading (29 September 2007)
Tottenham Hotspur 6–4 Reading (29 December 2007)

Top scorers

Fastest scorers

Clean sheets
Most clean sheets – Manchester United and Chelsea (21)
Fewest clean sheets – Derby County and Birmingham (3)

Discipline
First yellow card of the season: Didier Zokora for Tottenham Hotspur against Sunderland (11 August 2007)
First red card of the season: Dave Kitson for Reading against Manchester United (12 August 2007)
Most yellow cards: Middlesbrough (85)
Fewest yellow cards: Everton (40)
Most red cards: Chelsea and Fulham (6)
Fewest red cards: Bolton (0)

Average home attendance
Highest average home attendance: 75,691 (Manchester United)
Lowest average home attendance: 19,046 (Wigan Athletic)

Overall
Most wins – Manchester United (27)
Fewest wins – Derby County (1)
Most losses – Derby County (29)
Fewest losses – Arsenal and Chelsea (3)
Most goals scored – Manchester United (80)
Fewest goals scored – Derby County (20)
Most goals conceded – Derby County (89)
Fewest goals conceded – Manchester United (22)

Home
Most wins – Manchester United (17)
Fewest wins – Derby County (1)
Most losses – Derby County (13)
Fewest losses – Arsenal and Chelsea (0)
Most goals scored – Manchester United (47)
Fewest goals scored – Derby County (12)
Most goals conceded – Derby County (43)
Fewest goals conceded – Manchester United (7)

Away
Most wins – Chelsea (13)
Fewest wins – Derby County (0)
Most losses – Derby County (16)
Fewest losses – Arsenal, Chelsea and Liverpool (3)
Most goals scored – Arsenal and Aston Villa (37)
Fewest goals scored – Derby County (8)
Most goals conceded – Derby County (46)
Fewest goals conceded – Chelsea (13)

Records 
 Derby County finished with the worst record since the league was founded in 1992–93 and also the worst since the introduction of the three points for a win rule. Among the records set by the Rams were:
 A final record of one win, eight draws and 29 losses for a total of eleven points, worse than the Sunderland team from 2005–06, with the previously set lows of three wins, six draws and 29 losses totalling fifteen points. The single win, coming at home against Newcastle United 1–0 on 17 September was also a record for the fewest wins in a Premier League campaign
 Derby's 20 goals scored as a team (with Ronaldo, Adebayor and Torres each scoring more goals individually) was lower than the 2002–03 Black Cats' total with 21 goals scored. This marked the third time a team was outscored by one or more players. The team also failed to score in 21 of their 38 games
 Their −69 goal difference (20 goals scored, 89 conceded) was worse than Ipswich Town's 1994–95 goal difference of −57 (36 goals scored, 93 conceded). The 89 goals they conceded was the worst defensive performance by a team since Ipswich Town conceded 93 goals in 1994–95. It was also the worst record since the Premier League adopted the 20-team, 38-match format in 1995–96
 The 29 defeats they suffered equalled the 2005–06 Sunderland team for the most losses suffered in one Premier League season
 Chelsea's 85 points accumulated was a new record for the most points gained in a 38-game season without securing the title. The 83 points achieved by Arsenal was a new record for the most points gained in a 38-game season for finishing third
 Manchester United's goal difference of +58 was the greatest ever attained in a Premier League season, beating the record set by Chelsea in 2004–05
 Cristiano Ronaldo beat his own record for most goals scored by a midfielder, raising the record to 31 goals. The previous record was 17 goals, from the previous season. Furthermore, his goal total equalled the highest number of goals ever scored in the Premier League during a 38-game season, equalling the record first set by Blackburn Rovers' Alan Shearer during the 1995–96 season
 Marcus Bent and Roque Santa Cruz each scored a hat trick for their team during Wigan Athletic's 5–3 victory over Blackburn Rovers on 15 December 2007. This is the first time in Premier League history that players from opposing sides both scored hat-tricks in the same match
 Emmanuel Adebayor scored two hat tricks home and away against Derby. This was the first time in the Premier League that a player had scored a hat trick against the same team twice in the league
 Fernando Torres scored 24 goals for Liverpool, a new record for goals scored by a foreign player during his debut season

Awards

Monthly awards

Annual awards

Premier League Manager of the Season
Sir Alex Ferguson picked up the Premier League Manager of the Season award for the eighth time.

Premier League Player of the Season
Cristiano Ronaldo won the Premier League Player of the Season accolade for the second season in succession.

PFA Players' Player of the Year
The PFA Players' Player of the Year award for 2008 was won by Cristiano Ronaldo for the second year in a row.

The shortlist for the PFA Players' Player of the Year award, in alphabetical order, was as follows:
Emmanuel Adebayor (Arsenal)
Cesc Fàbregas (Arsenal)
Steven Gerrard (Liverpool)
David James (Portsmouth)
Cristiano Ronaldo (Manchester United)
Fernando Torres (Liverpool)

PFA Team of the Year

Goalkeeper: David James (Portsmouth)
Defence: Bacary Sagna, Gaël Clichy (both Arsenal), Rio Ferdinand, Nemanja Vidić (both Manchester United)
Midfield: Steven Gerrard (Liverpool), Cristiano Ronaldo (Manchester United), Cesc Fàbregas (Arsenal), Ashley Young (Aston Villa)

Attack: Emmanuel Adebayor (Arsenal), Fernando Torres (Liverpool)

PFA Young Player of the Year
The PFA Young Player of the Year award was won by Cesc Fàbregas of Arsenal.

The shortlist for the award was as follows:
Gabriel Agbonlahor (Aston Villa)
Cesc Fàbregas (Arsenal)
Micah Richards (Manchester City)
Cristiano Ronaldo (Manchester United)
Fernando Torres (Liverpool)
Ashley Young (Aston Villa)

FWA Footballer of the Year
The FWA Footballer of the Year award for 2008 was won by Cristiano Ronaldo for a second successive season. The Manchester United winger saw off the challenges of Liverpool striker Fernando Torres and Portsmouth goalkeeper David James, who finished second and third respectively.

Premier League Golden Boot
Cristiano Ronaldo was named the winner of the Premier League Golden Boot award. The Manchester United winger's 31 goals from 34 league appearances helped see off stiff opposition for this award from Arsenal's Emmanuel Adebayor and Fernando Torres of Liverpool. This was the first Premier League season that a player has scored more than 30 goals since Alan Shearer's 31-goal haul for Blackburn Rovers twelve years prior.

Premier League Golden Glove
Liverpool goalkeeper Pepe Reina claimed the Premier League Golden Glove award for the third season in succession. Clean sheets in 18 out of the 38 games meant Reina kept more clean sheets than any other goalkeeper in the top flight during the 2007–08 campaign.

Premier League Fair Play Award
The Premier League Fair Play Award is a merit given to the team who has been the most sporting and best behaved team. Tottenham topped the Fair Play League, ahead of Liverpool, Manchester United and Arsenal. The least sporting side was Blackburn Rovers who finished in last place in the rankings.

LMA Manager of the Year
The LMA Manager of the Year award was won by Sir Alex Ferguson after leading Manchester United to back-to-back league title wins. The award was presented by Fabio Capello on 13 May 2008.

PFA Fans' Player of the Year
2007 winner, Cristiano Ronaldo, was named the PFA Fans' Player of the Year again in 2008. Liverpool striker Fernando Torres finished second, with Arsenal midfielder Cesc Fàbregas finishing third.

PFA Merit Award
BBC broadcaster and former England and Blackpool full-back Jimmy Armfield received the PFA Merit Award for his services to the game.

Premier League Merit Award
Cristiano Ronaldo, the Portuguese winger, collected the Premier League Merit Award for reaching 30 league goals this season.

References

External links

 2007–08 Premier League season at RSSSF

 
Premier League seasons
Eng
1